"Take Me Over" is a song by Australian electronic music band Cut Copy, released as the second single from their third studio album, Zonoscope (2011). The song has become one of the band's most recognisable tunes. It was also met with positive critical reception, with critics noting the song's references to Fleetwood Mac's "Everywhere" and Men at Work's "Down Under".

Music video
The music video for "Take Me Over" was filmed by Australian director Kris Moyes in Sydney in November 2010, featuring jungle scenes, an Indiana Jones-style wardrobe and nude models. The clip, however, was never released due to production delays. In May 2012, a fan made music video for the song premiered online, directed by Ryan Patrick, and was subsequently adopted as the official video.

Track listings
UK digital single (2011)
"Take Me Over" – 5:08
"Take Me Over" (The Loving Hand Remix) – 10:23
"Take Me Over" (Azari & III Remix) – 6:03
"Take Me Over" (Mylo Remix) – 6:56
"Take Me Over" (Flight Facilities Remix) – 6:54

UK 12" single (2011)
"Take Me Over" – 5:08
"Take Me Over" (Azari & III Remix) – 6:03
"Take Me Over" (Thee Loving Hand Remix) – 10:24

Charts

Release history

References

2010 singles
2010 songs
Cut Copy songs
Modular Recordings singles